Electoral history of Christopher Dodd, senior United States senator from Connecticut (1981–2011), United States Representative (1975–1981), Democratic National Committee chairman (1995–1997) and a candidate for the 2008 Democratic presidential nomination

U.S. House elections 

Connecticut's 2nd congressional district, 1974:
 Christopher Dodd (D) – 104,436 (59.02%)
 Samuel B. Hellier (R) – 69,380 (39.21%)
 Anthony Discepolo (I) – 3,124 (1.77%)

Connecticut's 2nd congressional district, 1976:
 Christopher Dodd (D) (inc.) – 142,684 (65.07%)
 Richard Jackson (R) – 74,743 (34.09%)
 Anthony Discepolo (I) – 1,857 (0.85%)

Connecticut's 2nd congressional district, 1978:
 Christopher Dodd (D) (inc.) – 116,624 (69.91%)
 Thomas Hudson Connell (R) – 50,167 (30.07%)
 Others (write-ins) – 23 (0.01%)

U.S. Senate elections 

1980 Connecticut United States Senate election:
 Christopher Dodd (D) – 763,969 (56.34%)
 James L. Buckley (R) – 581,884 (42.91%)
 Jerry Brennan (LBT) – 5,336 (0.39%)
 Andrew J. Zemel (Concerned Citizens) – 4,772 (0.35%)
 Others (write-ins) – 114 (0.01%)

1986 Connecticut United States Senate election:
 Christopher Dodd (D) (inc.) – 632,695 (64.76%)
 Roger W. Eddy (R) – 340,438 (34.85%)
 Edward J. McCallum, Jr. (I) – 3,800 (0.39%)

1992 Connecticut United States Senate election:
 Christopher Dodd (D) (inc.) – 882,569 (58.81%)
 Brook Johnson (R) – 572,036 (38.12%)
 Richard D. Gregory (Concerned Citizens) – 35,315 (2.35%)
 Howard A. Grayson, Jr. (LBT) – 10,741 (0.72%)

1998 Connecticut United States Senate election:
 Christopher Dodd (D) (inc.) – 628,306 (65.15%)
 Gary Franks (R) – 312,177 (32.37%)
 William Kozak, Jr. (Concerned Citizens) – 12,261 (1.27%)
 Lois A. Grasso (Term Limits) – 6,517 (0.68%)
 Wildey J. Moore (LBT) – 5,196 (0.54%)

2004 Connecticut United States Senate election:
 Christopher Dodd (D) (inc.) – 945,347 (66.35%)
 Jack Orchulli (R) – 457,749 (32.13%)
 Timothy A. Knibbs (Concerned Citizens) – 12,442 (0.87%)
 Lenny Rasch (LBT) (write-in) – 9,188 (0.65%)

Presidential elections 
2008 New Hampshire Democratic Vice Presidential primary:

 Raymond Stebbins – 50,485 (46.93%)
 William Bryk – 22,965 (21.35%)
 John Edwards* – 10,553 (9.81%)
 Barack Obama* – 6,402 (5.95%)
 Bill Richardson* – 5,525 (5.14%)
 Hillary Clinton* – 3,419 (3.18%)
 Joe Biden* – 1,512 (1.41%)
 Al Gore* – 966 (0.90%)
 Dennis Kucinich* – 762 (0.71%)
 Bill Clinton* – 388 (0.36%)
 John McCain* – 293 (0.27%)
 Christopher Dodd* – 224 (0.21%)
 Ron Paul* – 176 (0.16%)
 Jack Barnes, Jr.* – 95 (0.09%)
 Mike Gravel* – 91 (0.09%)
 Joe Lieberman* – 67 (0.06%)
 Mitt Romney* – 66 (0.06%)
 Mike Huckabee* – 63 (0.06%)
 Rudy Giuliani* – 46 (0.04%)
 Darrel Hunter* – 20 (0.02%)

(* – write-in candidate)

2008 Democratic presidential primaries:

Excluding penalized contests, only primary and caucuses votes:
 
 Barack Obama – 16,706,853
 Hillary Clinton – 16,239,821
 John Edwards* – 742,010
 Bill Richardson* – 89,054
 Uncommitted – 82,660
 Dennis Kucinich* – 68,482
 Joe Biden* – 64,041
 Mike Gravel* – 27,662
 Christopher Dodd* – 25,300
 Others – 22,556

Including penalized contests:

 Hillary Clinton – 18,225,175 (48.03%)
 Barack Obama – 17,988,182 (47.41%)
 John Edwards* – 1,006,275 (2.65%)
 Uncommitted – 299,610 (0.79%)
 Bill Richardson* – 106,073 (0.28%)
 Dennis Kucinich* – 103,994 (0.27%)
 Joe Biden* – 81,641 (0.22%)
 Scattering – 44,348 (0.12%)
 Mike Gravel* – 40,251 (0.11%)
 Christopher Dodd* – 35,281 (0.09%)

(* – dropped out from race)

Leadership election 
United States Senate Minority Leader (Democratic), 1994:
 Tom Daschle – 24
 Christopher Dodd – 23

References 

Dodd, Christopher
Chris Dodd